Hans Cavalli-Björkman (29 June 1928 – 18 August 2020) was a Swedish Lawyer and former chairman of the Swedish Association football club Malmö FF, a post he held between 1975 and 1998. During Cavalli-Björkman's years at the club they won four Swedish championships as well as six Svenska Cupen titles. His predecessor was Eric Persson. Besides being chairman at Malmö FF, he was also CEO of Swedish bank SEB in the late 1980s.

Honours won by club during presidency
Allsvenskan:
 Winners (7): 1975, 1977, 1985, 1986, 1987,  1988, 1989
 Runners-up (5): 1976, 1978, 1980, 1983, 1996
Svenska Cupen:
 Winners (6): 1974–75, 1977–78, 1979–80, 1983–84, 1985–86, 1988–89
 Runners-up (1): 1995–96
 European Cup
 Runners-up (1): 1978–79
 Intercontinental Cup
 Runners-up (1): 1979

References 

Swedish sports executives and administrators
Malmö FF chairmen
1928 births
2020 deaths